Sabatia grandiflora is a flowering plant in the genus Sabatia. Commonly known as marsh-pink or largeflower rose gentian, the annual has pink flowers. It grows in parts of Florida and Alabama. The flowers have five pink petals and a yellow center.

References

grandiflora